Berchtesgaden is a municipality in the district Berchtesgadener Land, Bavaria, in southeastern Germany, near the border with Austria,  south of Salzburg and  southeast of Munich. It lies in the Berchtesgaden Alps, south of Berchtesgaden; the Berchtesgaden National Park stretches along three parallel valleys.

The Kehlstein mountain, with its Kehlsteinhaus (Eagle's Nest) is located in the area.

Etymology
Berchtesgaden, Upper Bavaria (Achental), earlier Perchterscadmen, Perhtersgadem, Berchirchsgadem, Berchtoldesgadem; the word underwent a Latin distortion of Old High German parach, Romance bareca 'hay shed'. After the basic meaning was forgotten, a variant word of Old High German gadem 'room, one-room hut' was added, implying the same meaning: 'hay shed'. Cf. Old High German muosgadem 'spice room'. 

There was a folk etymology that supported a derivation based on the legendary figure of Frau Perchta (Berchta), a woman (Holle < Holda 'well disposed, dear') with good and bad changing features, who was venerated on Perchtertag (Shrovetide) and was sworn to during the Perchta procession.

History
The first ever historical note dates back to 1102 and mentions the area because of its rich salt deposits. Much of Berchtesgaden's wealth has been derived from its salt mines, the first of which started operations in 1517. The town served as independent Fürstpropstei until the Reichsdeputationshauptschluss in 1803. During the Napoleonic wars, Berchtesgaden changed hands a few times, such as in 1805 under the Treaty of Pressburg, when the area was ceded to Austria.

Berchtesgaden came under Bavarian rule in 1810 and became instantly popular with the Bavarian royal family, the House of Wittelsbach, who often visited Königssee and maintained a royal hunting residence in the former Augustine monastery (still used today by Franz, Duke of Bavaria). Nascent tourism started to evolve and a number of artists came to the area, which reportedly gave rise to Malereck ("painters' corner") on the shore of the Königssee in nearby Schönau am Königssee. The most famous author who lived in Berchtesgaden was Ludwig Ganghofer.

Nazi era

Adolf Hitler had been vacationing in the Berchtesgaden area since the 1920s. He purchased a home in the Obersalzberg above the town on the flank of the Hoher Goll and began extensive renovations on his Berghof in the following years. As other top Third Reich figures, such as Hermann Göring, Joseph Goebbels, Martin Bormann, Heinrich Himmler, and Albert Speer, began to frequent the area the Party began to purchase and requisition land in the Obersalzberg.

In order to serve as an outpost of the German Reichskanzlei (Imperial Chancellery), Berchtesgaden and its environs (Stanggass) saw substantial expansion of offices, security, and support services, mainly on the Obersalzberg.  Included in the town were a new railway station, with a reception area for Hitler and his guests, and an adjacent post office. The Berchtesgadener Hof Hotel, where famous visitors such as Neville Chamberlain and David Lloyd George stayed, was substantially upgraded.

Even though a feared Alpine Fortress last stand of the Nazi Regime in the Alps failed to materialize late in World War II, the Allies launched a devastating air raid on the Berchtesgaden area in the spring of 1945. The 25 April bombing of Obersalzberg did little damage to the town. On 4 May, forward elements of the 7th Infantry Regiment of the 3rd Infantry Division arrived and received the town's surrender.

Post–World War II
After the war, Berchtesgaden became a military zone and most of its buildings were requisitioned by the U.S. Army. Hotel Platterhof was rebuilt and renamed the General Walker Hotel in 1952. It served as an integral part of the U.S. Armed Forces Recreation Centers for the duration of the Cold War and beyond. The remnants of homes of former Nazi leaders were all demolished in the early postwar years, though traces of some remained. In 1995, fifty years after the end of World War II and five years after German reunification, the AFRC Berchtesgaden was turned over to Bavarian authorities to facilitate military spending reductions mandated within the Base Realignment and Closure program by the US Congress and Pentagon during the administration of President Bill Clinton. The General Walker Hotel was demolished in 2000–2001.

In 1986, Berchtesgaden was a first-round candidate city to host the XVI Olympic Winter Games to be held in 1992. The vote eventually went to Albertville, France, in October of that year.

Berchtesgaden today

The Hotel Türken, which was near the Nazi buildings and was often used by the SS and then by the Generalmajor of the Police, was badly damaged in 1945. It was rebuilt in 1950 and reopened as a hotel before Christmas. Visitors can still explore the historic underground hallways and tunnels that had been used by the Nazis.

In 1972, local government reform united the then independent municipalities of Salzberg, Maria Gern and Au (consisting of Oberau and Unterau) under the administration of the town of Berchtesgaden. Another suggested reform uniting all remaining five municipalities in the Berchtesgaden valley (Bischofswiesen, Ramsau, Marktschellenberg and Schönau) failed to gain enough popular support; it passed in Berchtesgaden but failed everywhere else.

The Berchtesgaden National Park was established in 1978 and has gradually become one of Berchtesgaden's largest draws. Mass tourism is confined to a few popular spots, leaving the rest to nature-seekers. Other tourist draws are the Königssee, the salt mine, the Kehlsteinhaus, open seasonally as a restaurant, and the Dokumentationszentrum Obersalzberg museum about the area's history, operated by the Munich Institut für Zeitgeschichte since 1999.

Recreational and competitive sports have grown in importance. The town's ski slope is popular. The Königssee bobsleigh, luge, and skeleton track has hosted ski-running and a number of international events and competitions. Berchtesgaden's most famous sports personality is Georg Hackl, a multiple Olympic medal winner. The city is home to the International Luge Federation (FIL).

Unlike the northern part of Berchtesgadener Land and the Salzburg area, Berchtesgaden has virtually no manufacturing industry.

Berchtesgaden Central Station is connected by the Salzburg–Berchtesgaden railway to the Rosenheim–Salzburg railway at Freilassing.

The Bavarian state government facilitated the erection of a hotel, which opened in 2005 and is operated by the InterContinental Hotels Group. Since May 2015, the hotel has been the Kempinski Berchtesgaden.

Geography
Berchtesgaden's neighbouring towns are Bischofswiesen, Marktschellenberg, Ramsau, and Schönau am Königssee.

The municipality counts the following villages which are (Ortsteil): Am Etzerschlößl, Anzenbach, Hintergern, Metzenleiten, Mitterbach, Oberau, Obergern, Obersalzberg, Resten, Unterau, Untersalzberg I, Untersalzberg II, and Vordergern.

Notable people

 Wolfgang Bartels, (1940–2007), Olympic alpine skier bronze medalist
 Karl Bartos, (born 1952), electronic musician, former electronic percussionist in the band Kraftwerk
 Sigmund Freud, (1856–1939), psychoanalyst, owned a house for family holidays in Schönau near Obersalzberg. His villa was taken over during the Second World War by Heinrich Himmler.
 Franz Graßl, (born 1965), ski mountaineer
 Judith Graßl, (born 1968), ski mountaineer
 Georg Hackl, (born 1966), first Winter Olympics competitor to win five consecutive medals with consecutively two silver and three gold medals in the men's single luge event

 Kathrin Hölzl, alpine ski racer and gold medalist in the giant slalom at the 2009 World Championships
 Princess Irmingard of Bavaria, Nazi resister and survivor of Oranienburg-Sachsenhausen, Flossenbürg and Dachau concentration camps
Katrya Hrynevycheva, Ukrainian writer and community leader.
 Jutta Kleinschmidt, (born 1962), German offroad automotive racing competitor
 Toni Kurz, (1913–1936), German 20th century mountaineer
 Patric Leitner, five-time winner of luge World Cup and four-time World Championship titles (in men's doubles with Alexander Resch)
 Felix Loch, four-time luge gold medalist (two in singles and two in mixed team) FIL World Luge Championships
 Manuel Machata (born 1984), German former bobsledder
 Peter Öttl, Grand Prix motorcycle road racer
 Hans Plenk, Olympic bronze-medalist in the men's single luge event
 Romy Schneider, (1938–1982), German-French film actress
Kaspar Stanggassinger, (1871-1899), Redemptorist priest, declared Blessed in 1988
 Silvia Treimer, ski mountaineer
 Hermann von Barth, (1845–1876), German 19th century mountaineer
 John Allan Wyeth (1894–1981), American war poet and Post-Impressionist painter, was a regular visitor to Berchtesgaden, where he would indulge in his passion for landscape painting, during the 1930s.

Toy symphonies
in the 1760s a number of anonymous toy symphonies (including the famous Toy Symphony often attributed to Haydn or Leopold Mozart) were composed at Berchtesgaden, then a manufacturing centre for toy instruments. Some of the instruments used for these can be seen in the Museum Carolino Augusteum in Salzburg.

References

External links

  
 Regional tourism portal 
 Regional website for visitors and tourists 
 Berchtesgaden National Park pictures and information
 PhotoGlobe – Berchtesgadener Land offers high quality photos of the area around Berchtesgaden together with GPS coordinates.
 AFRC Timeline
 "Third Reich in Ruins"  (historical and modern comparison photos)
 Pictures from Berchtesgaden
 Map of Bavaria in 1789
 Berchtesgaden military intelligence records, Kislak Center for Special Collections, Rare Books and Manuscripts, University of Pennsylvania

Berchtesgadener Land
Ski areas and resorts in Germany